Religion & Ethics Newsweekly was an American weekly television news-magazine program which aired on PBS.

History and content
Premiering in 1997, Religion & Ethics Newsweekly was devoted to news of religion and spirituality, along with major ethical issues. The program explored the top moral questions facing the country and profiled notable people and groups in the world of religion and ethics. As of February, 2017, the series has been canceled.

Production and distribution
Religion & Ethics Newsweekly had been produced by Thirteen/WNET in New York City, New York, since its premiere, and was filmed on location worldwide. The main studio was in downtown Washington, D.C., in the same building as Reuters news agency.

The program was distributed to PBS stations nationwide.

Host
The program was hosted by journalist Bob Abernethy.

References

External links
 Religion & Ethics NewsWeekly's official website
 

1997 American television series debuts
1990s American television news shows
2000s American television news shows
2010s American television news shows
Corporation for Public Broadcasting
English-language television shows
PBS original programming
Television series by WNET
American religious television series
Philosophy television series